Sheik I Kamara is a Sierra Leonean politician. He is a member of Parliament from the Western Area Rural District (or West-East District) with the Sierra Leone People's Party as well as a representative at the Pan-African Parliament.

References

Year of birth missing (living people)
Living people
Members of the Pan-African Parliament from Sierra Leone
Members of the Parliament of Sierra Leone
Sierra Leone People's Party politicians